Backeljaia camporroblensis is a species of air-breathing land snail, a terrestrial pulmonate gastropod mollusc in the family Geomitridae.

References

camporroblensis
Gastropods described in 1944